Alaraz (also Romanized as Alāraz, Alārz, and Elārz) is a village in Shohada Rural District, Yaneh Sar District, Behshahr County, Mazandaran Province, Iran. At the 2006 census, its population was 80, in 30 families.

References 

Populated places in Behshahr County